The sand-verbena moth (Copablepharon fuscum) is a moth of the family Noctuidae. It is found on sandy ocean beaches in British Columbia and Washington.

The wingspan is 35–40 mm.

The larvae feed on Abronia latifolia.

External links
A new species of Copablepharon (Lepidoptera: Noctuidae) from British Columbia and Washington
Recovery Strategy for Sand-verbena Moth (Copablepharon fuscum) in British Columbia

Noctuinae
Moths of North America